Demetrius I may refer to:

Demetrius I of Macedon (337–283 BC), king of Macedon
Demetrius I of Bactria, Greco-Bactrian king (reigned c. 200–180 BC)
Demetrius I Soter (born 185 BC, reign 161–150 BC), ruler of the Hellenistic Seleucid Empire
Pope Demetrius I of Alexandria, ruled in 189–232
Demetrius Zvonimir of Croatia (died 1089), King of Croatia
Demetrius I of Georgia (c. 1093–1156), Georgian king
Demetrius I Starshy (died 1399), Duke of Bryansk
Demetrius I Qadi (1861–1925), Patriarch of the Melkite Greek Catholic Church
Patriarch Demetrius I of Constantinople (1914–1991), Ecumenical Patriarch of Constantinople

See also
 Patriarch Dimitrije, Serbian Patriarch in 1920–1930